Bu Xiaolin (born August 1958) is a Chinese politician of Mongol descent. She had served as chairwoman of the Inner Mongolia Autonomous Region People's Government  (equivalent of a provincial governor) since March 2016. She is the daughter of Buhe, a former chairman of Inner Mongolia, and the granddaughter of Ulanhu, the founding chairman of Inner Mongolia Autonomous Region and a Vice President of China.

Biography 
Bu Xiaolin was born in August 1958 in Tumed Left Banner, Inner Mongolia. She briefly worked as a sent-down youth at the end of the Cultural Revolution, before enlisting in the People's Liberation Army. She served as a medic in No. 291 Hospital of the Inner Mongolia Military District from 1977 to 1980.

In September 1980 she entered Peking University and graduated with a degree in economic law four years later. After graduation she briefly taught law at Inner Mongolia University, before joining the regional government of Inner Mongolia in 1985. From 1998 to 2001 she enrolled in the law school of Jilin University on a part-time basis, earning a doctoral degree in law in 2001. From 2003 to 2006 she conducted post-doctoral research at the Institute of Sociology of the Chinese Academy of Social Sciences.

She was appointed Chief of Alxa League in September 2004, and Communist Party secretary two years later. In January 2008 she was promoted to Vice-Chairwoman of Inner Mongolia. In January 2014, she became Head of the United Front department of Inner Mongolia, as well as a member of the Regional Party Standing Committee. She succeeded the position left vacant by Wang Suyi, who was investigated for corruption and later sentenced to life in prison.

On 30 March 2016, Bu Xiaolin was appointed acting chairwoman of Inner Mongolia, succeeding Bagatur, who had resigned. Bu Xiaolin was the second woman to serve as leader of the Inner Mongolia government, and the sixth woman in the history of Communist-ruled China (after Gu Xiulian, Uyunqimg, Song Xiuyan, Li Bin and Liu Hui) to serve as the head of a provincial-level government. She was confirmed as chairwoman on June 23.

On 20 August 2021, she was appointed vice chairperson of the National People's Congress Environment Protection and Resources Conservation Committee.

Family 
Bu Xiaolin is the daughter of Buhe and the granddaughter of Ulanhu, who both served as chairman of Inner Mongolia. Ulanhu was a founding general and Vice President of the People's Republic of China.

References 

1958 births
Living people
Chinese people of Mongolian descent
Political office-holders in Inner Mongolia
People's Republic of China politicians from Inner Mongolia
Chinese Communist Party politicians from Inner Mongolia
People from Hohhot
Peking University alumni
Jilin University alumni
Academic staff of Inner Mongolia University
21st-century Chinese women politicians
21st-century Chinese politicians
Members of the 19th Central Committee of the Chinese Communist Party
Delegates to the 12th National People's Congress
Delegates to the 10th National People's Congress